John or Johnny Gregory may refer to:

Sportspeople
John Gregory (cricketer, born 1887) (1887–1914), Hampshire cricketer
John Gregory (cricketer, born 1842) (1842–1894), English cricketer
Colin Gregory (John Colin Gregory, 1903–1959), British tennis player
Jack Gregory (American football coach) (1927–2014), college football head coach for East Stroudsburg, Villanova, and Rhode Island
John Gregory (American football coach) (1938–2022), American football coach
John Gregory (footballer) (born 1954), English footballer and coach
Johnny Gregory (footballer) (1905–1992), Australian footballer

Others
John Gregory (scholar) (1607–1646), English orientalist
John Gregory (settler) (1612–1689), founding settler of Norwalk, Connecticut
John Gregory (moralist) (1724–1773), Scottish physician and writer
John Munford Gregory (1804–1884), governor of Virginia, United States, 1842–1843
John Gregory (engineer) (1806—c. 1848), English engineer and member of Franklin's Lost Expedition
John Milton Gregory (1822–1898), first President of the University of Illinois at Urbana-Champaign, United States, 1867–1880
John Gregory (poet) (1831–1922), trade unionist and Bristol's 'poet cobbler'
John Walter Gregory (1864–1932), British and Australian geologist and explorer
John Duncan Gregory (1878–1951), British diplomat dismissed for speculation in foreign currencies
John Gregory (politician) (1878–1955), Canadian member of Parliament
John Gregory (sculptor) (1879–1958), American sculptor
John F. Gregory (1927–2009), optical worker and creator of the Gregory-Maksutov telescope design
John M. Gregory (businessman), American former CEO of King Pharmaceuticals, Inc. in the 1990s
John Gregory (bandleader) (1924–2020), English bandleader who often recorded under the name "Chaquito"
John Gregory (priest), Anglican priest
John S. Gregory, Australian professor of Chinese history

See also
Jack Gregory (disambiguation)